Gabriel Grüner and Volker Krämer were two journalists for Stern magazine who were shot by Yugoslavian soldiers at a check point at the Dulje Pass on the west side of Kosovo, near the village of Dulje, Prizrenski Podgor about 25 km from Prizren, two days after the Kosovo War had ended on June 13, 1999.

The pair of journalists were the first civilians from a NATO country to be killed during the war. Their translator Senol Alit was also killed on site.

Gabriel Grüner

Personal
Gabriel Grüner was born on August 8, 1963 in Mals, Italy. He studied at the University of Innsbruck, Innsbruck, Austria. Grüner's girlfriend was Beatrix Gerstberger, who was six months pregnant with their first child Jakob at the time of his death. He was killed at the age of 35 and was buried in Italy. Gerstberger, also a journalist, wrote a book where she documented her own story about Grüner and collected the stories of other women who had lost their husbands.

Career
Grüner started his journalism career in 1991, and worked for eight years before he was killed. He was reporting from around the world and had been to Afghanistan, Algerien, Sudan. He was awarded several awards for his great works, such as the World Press Photo Award and the Royal Society of Photography.

Volker Krämer

Personal
Volker Krämer was possibly born on October 12, 1943 in Germany. "Volker has done an extraordinary job, so he has been able to work for the Stern for so long, because he can choose between the best photographers in the world and therefore he is very good at work, which was also fun to him," stated one of his classmates. Not much information can be recovered from his personal life. He was encouraged in his career by his mother. He took notes on different things in addition to taking photographs. However, photography was what he loved to do. He and his mother would travel together and he would take photos that inspired him. He worked for the Stern magazine for many years. He once said: "When I am a reporter, I move in the everyday lives of normal people, and through the camera I notice how absurd and partially funny which sometimes looks."

Career
Krämer worked for the Stern magazine for about thirty years. He had been with the company longer than Grüner. He started his career as a 3-year apprentice for Rheinische Post publishing house in Düsseldorf before he was hired on to the Stern. He only photographed for the Stern on occasion. An exhibition of his pictures was organized with the help of the then-director of the Wilhelm Fabry School, Hans-Gunther Eckerth. He wrote notes and observed the focal points of the world through his photographs. He was inspired to take pictures for the Stern from his earlier years taking pictures on his own time. He was described as having a unique point of view. He was also drawn to crisis areas, which were not safe for photographers. He took pictures and captured information there that he would return to the Stern newsweekly. He played a big role in the magazine and dedicated a lot of his personal time to his stories. One of his most famous articles is based on the topic of home births.

Death
On June 13, 1999, at the Dulje Pass in Kosovo both journalists were shot and killed when they were caught in an ambush. As they were heading back on the "safe route" across the Dulje Pass, they came across a checkpoint by Yugolsalvian soldiers. They were then chased. As they tried to escape, they were shot. Krämer died immediately from shots fired and Grüner succumbed to his wounds later at the hospital. They were there reporting on German lifestyles and taking photographs of the country. There is no set cause as to why they were shot and killed.

To this day, it is still unclear whether they were in unmarked cars. They were driving around looking for mass graves. As they were going to take photographs and take notes to return the information. They then lost track of where they were and needed help getting back home.

They approached Yugoslavia troops, who said they would show them where the graves were and help them return. However, that is not how it played out. The soldiers had lied to them. They tried escaping, but could not get away.

Unable to get away, Krämer was shot in the head and died immediately after the wound. It is said that his body laid there for several hours. A Spiegel editor photographed his body from a safe distance. Grüner, however, was badly wounded by gunfire. He was found by British soldiers and taken to a hospital in Tetovo, Macedonia. Grüner was pronounced dead later that day.

The reason for the soldiers' shooting of the pair is still unknown.

Context
The deaths were connected back to the soldiers not knowing what they were doing there. They took matters into their own hands and killed them, as they may of felt obligated. They did not trust what the journalists were saying to them, so they felt it was their job to keep everyone else there safe. As they fled, the soldiers thought they were up to no good and fire shots. After the shootings, investigations were made about any charges felt necessary against the troops. The journalists were not in the wrong nor doing anything that should have been seen as sketchy. However, as to every story it can be looked at from both ways, but sense they were no longer hear to speak on their part of the story it had to be one sided.

Impact
The impact from their deaths were very shocking and discouraging to the Stern. Sadly, they were not the first journalist to be killed working for that company. However, them being that deep into the magazine caused issues with such short notice. They were considered the star editors. It was unexpected, and not to mention they were working on a project when the deaths occurred. There was nobody that could replace all the time and hard work that they had put into the magazine. Nonetheless, they did not want to look nor think about having to replace them. They were two of the main faces for the Stern. Not only did families suffer, but so did their fellow workers, and the community as a whole. Due to their deaths they have been honored at ceremony's and recognize and remember them. There is a Volker Krämer: Begegnungen that has ninety photos from the photographer. More than six hundred journalists have been killed.

Reactions
In reaction to the journalist's deaths, people opened their eyes to the dangers that these men face on a day-to-day basics just trying to do their jobs. Precautions were starting to be made in these foreign countries when journalists were traveling. In the time of their death, they had no security as they could walk around freely. They had no form of protection, but from each other. There was demand for better protection. Now, journalists have security whether it be where they are staying or following them around as they work. Not only are the journalist's put into danger, but there camera crew or people helping them as well. Refugees are no longer to stand on the lines of the killing field. Kosovo's Serbs feared they would take bloody revenge for what had happened. More troops were called into the area. However, not everything can be solved it has made for better protection. There deaths were a rough time for the magazine, but some times it takes a traumatic event for changes to be made.

Gabriel-Grüner-Grant 
In 1999, the Gabriel-Grüner-Grant was initiated in memory of the murdered journalists. The grant is being awarded annually for courageous pieces of journalism. It is valued at EUR 6,000.

Memorial
There is a memorial stone for Grüner and Krämer at the Dulje Pass, Kosovo.

See also
List of journalists killed in Europe

References

External links
 NATO's role in relation to the conflict in Kosovo

German journalists
Photographers from North Rhine-Westphalia
Journalists killed while covering the Yugoslav Wars
Civilian casualties in the Kosovo War
Stern (magazine) people
People from Hilden
Deaths by firearm in Kosovo